Ficksburg Commando was a light infantry regiment of the South African Army. It formed part of the South African Army Infantry Formation as well as the South African Territorial Reserve.

History

Origin
This commando can trace its origin to the Free State–Basotho Wars of 1858 -1868.

Operations

With the Orange Free State Republic

During the Anglo Boer War
The commando was again involved in the Anglo Boer War most notable being:
 Elements of this commando was engaged at the battle of Magersfontein on 11 December 1899.
 The battle of Biddulphberg in 1900.

Surrender
On the morning of 30 July 1900, General Hunter received the surrender of Commandants Prinsloo and Crowther of the Ficksburg Commando and the Ladybrand Commando.

With the UDF
By 1902 all Commando remnants were under British military control and disarmed.

By 1912, however previous Commando members could join shooting associations.

By 1940, such commandos were under control of the National Reserve of Volunteers.

These commandos were formally reactivated by 1948.

With the SADF
This commando was primarily used in this era for area force protection, border operations and stock theft control.

With the SANDF

Disbandment
This unit, along with all other Commando units was disbanded after a decision by South African President Thabo Mbeki to disband all Commando Units. The Commando system was phased out between 2003 and 2008 "because of the role it played in the apartheid era", according to the Minister of Safety and Security Charles Nqakula.

Unit Insignia

Leadership

References

See also 
 South African Commando System

Infantry regiments of South Africa
South African Commando Units